St. Bernard's Church and Parish House is a historic church complex located at 88 Claremont Road in the borough of Bernardsville in Somerset County, New Jersey. This Episcopal Church in the Episcopal Diocese of New Jersey is named after St. Bernard of Clairvaux. It was added to the National Register of Historic Places on September 6, 2006, for its significance in architecture.

History and description
The congregation was organized on October 22, 1896 and the building committee selected the architectural firm Napoleon LeBrun & Sons to design and build the church. Built with schist laid as random ashlar, it was designed to be a "purely English Gothic" church. It features a four-stage square tower with an attached hexagonal stair turret and topped with a metal cross. The cornerstone is dated 1897 and the church opened on June 29, 1898. The parish house was designed by architect Henry Janeway Hardenbergh, also a member of the congregation, and built in 1912. The stained-glass windows were made by the studios of Victorian designer Charles Eamer Kempe.

See also 
 National Register of Historic Places listings in Somerset County, New Jersey
 List of Episcopal churches in the United States

References

External links 
 
 

Bernardsville, New Jersey
Episcopal church buildings in New Jersey
Churches on the National Register of Historic Places in New Jersey
Gothic Revival church buildings in New Jersey
Churches completed in 1897
19th-century Episcopal church buildings
Churches in Somerset County, New Jersey
National Register of Historic Places in Somerset County, New Jersey
New Jersey Register of Historic Places
1897 establishments in New Jersey
Stone churches in New Jersey
Henry Janeway Hardenbergh buildings